Ludwig Kneiss (born Bundenthal, 11 November 1830 in – died Munich, 25 April 1900) was a German bass, baritone, and tenor singer and stage actor.

Career 
Kneiss played on several Austrian stages from 1853 to 1863, in 1864 at the Munich Hoftheater (Munich court theatre), and for a short time in Ulm, before he got his actor's training at Adolf Christen at the Münchner Aktientheater from 1865 to 1867.

In the subsequent years, he was engaged by theatres in several German cities and in Amsterdam. In 1872, he went back to Munich, where he played at the Gärtnerplatztheater. One of his roles was "Grattabugia", the innkeeper in Carl Zeller's operetta Die Fornarina. Later he worked as secretary in the direction of the Gärtnerplatztheater and as librarian.

References 

1830 births
1900 deaths
German operatic baritones
German operatic basses
German operatic tenors
German male stage actors
People from Südwestpfalz
People from the Palatinate (region)
19th-century German male actors
19th-century German male opera singers